Three Amigos is a 1986 American comedy film.

Three Amigos also may refer to:
 The Three Amigos (band), from the UK
 The Three Amigos Campaign, animated announcements promoting safe sex
 The Three Amigos, a "Specification Workshop" in behavior-driven development
 North American Leaders' Summit, commonly known as the "Three Amigos Summit", semi-regular trilateral meetings between the leaders of Canada, Mexico, and the United States.
 The prominent Mexican film directors Guillermo del Toro, Alfonso Cuarón and Alejandro Iñárritu are often referred to as the Three Amigos of Cinema.

See also
Tres Amigos (disambiguation)
Tre Amigos, a 1993 album by Swedish hip hop group Just D
The Three Caballeros, 1944 Disney film
 Three Comrades, Remarque novel and film
 Three Friends